Ernst Wroldsen  (born 4 December 1944) is a Norwegian politician.

He was born in Langesund to Valter Johan Wroldsen and Dagny Agathe Kristensen. He was elected representative to the Storting for the period 1981–1985 for the Labour Party, and reelected for the period 1985–1989, and again the period 1989–1993.

References

1944 births
Living people
People from Bamble
Labour Party (Norway) politicians
Members of the Storting